Earnestville is an unincorporated community in Lee County, Kentucky, United States. The post office closed in 1959.

References

Unincorporated communities in Lee County, Kentucky
Unincorporated communities in Kentucky